Lianhua Subdistrict is a subdistrict within the Yanjiang District of Ziyang City in Sichuan, China. Its population was 78,374 as of 2010. The subdistrict's administrative division code is 512002001000.

Etymology 
The district's name translates directly as lotus.

History 
Lianhua Subdistrict was created in November, 2005 was part of a wider administrative reshuffling done by the Sichuan Provincial Government.

Administrative divisions
The subdistrict is divided into 11 communities:

 Yanzhong Community
 Yanbei Community
 Xiangyang Community
 Guanyinge Community
 Train Station Community
 Haichuan Community
 Shuanglongjing Community
 Jiuyanqiao Community
 Chengbei Community
 Lianhua Community
 Binjiang Road Community

References 

Township-level divisions of Sichuan
Subdistricts of the People's Republic of China
Ziyang